Williams Arena is an indoor arena located in Minneapolis, Minnesota. It is the home arena for the University of Minnesota's men's and women's basketball teams. It also housed the men's hockey team until 1993, when it moved into its own building, 3M Arena at Mariucci. The building is popularly known as The Barn, and its student section is known as "The Barnyard".

Williams Arena is located on the southwest corner of the intersection of University Avenue and 19th Ave. SE in Minneapolis on the university's East Bank campus. It is in a neighborhood called Stadium Village, named for the old Memorial Stadium that stood there until its demolition in 1992. The arena is adjacent to Huntington Bank Stadium, 3M Arena at Mariucci and Ridder Arena, where the football and hockey teams respectively play.

History
When the Gophers basketball team first organized, they played games in the on-campus YMCA. In 1896, the team moved into the campus Armory, a large building with gymnasium space for the team to use, even if basketball was not its primary purpose. The Gophers remained in the Armory for almost 30 years. Halfway through the 1924–25 season, coach Harold Taylor moved the team from the University Armory to the Kenwood Armory in downtown Minneapolis. This significantly increased the attendance: capacity at the University Armory was 2,000, but it was 6,500 at Kenwood. The team only played at Kenwood for a few seasons, however, as the University of Minnesota Field House (later known as Williams Arena) opened partway through the 1927–1928 season. The team moved in on January 31, 1928.
Initially known as the Minnesota Field House (a name now used for a different building), Williams Arena opened in 1928. The original construction of the arena cost $650,000. The arena was remodeled in 1950, and renamed Williams Arena after Henry L. Williams, the football coach from 1900 to 1921.

As part of the 1950 renovation, it was divided into two separate arenas within one building: a larger one for basketball and a smaller one for hockey. Both arenas were called Williams Arena until March 2, 1985, when the hockey section was renamed Mariucci Arena after longtime Gopher hockey coach John Mariucci. The hockey team moved into a new building across the street from Williams in 1993, also named Mariucci Arena. The old Mariucci Arena within Williams was remodeled into the Sports Pavilion, now the Maturi Pavilion, named for former University of Minnesota athletic director Joel Maturi in August 2017. which houses the volleyball, wrestling, and gymnastic teams.

The venue hosted the 1951 NCAA Division I men's basketball tournament championship game and the 1964 NCAA Division I men's basketball tournament Mideast Regional. Williams Arena has hosted the 1st and 2nd rounds of the NCAA women's basketball tournament in 2005, 2007, and 2010. The hockey portion of Williams hosted the Frozen Four in 1958 and 1966. The Minnesota Lynx played all of their 2017 postseason home games at Williams Arena, ultimately winning the franchise's fourth WNBA championship in the building.

Williams Arena was used for the filming of scenes in the 1978 film, Ice Castles.

Design

The building has an arched roof, in the same manner as an airplane hangar. The double arch steel beams allows an open space for the bleachers and floor. There are some seats with partially obscured views due to the upper deck extending past the trusses. Over the summer of 2012, a new Daktronics videoboard and fascia displays were installed as part of a sporting facility update, replacing the older board. The new board is 11'7"x13'8" with LED rings above and below the main display. The fascia extends 360° around the arena.

Raised floor
Williams Arena features an unusual raised floor design. The court surface is raised above the ground approximately two feet so that team benches and scorer's table are below the court. The same goes for fans with the first row, who look at players at about knee-level. Normally, other than the officials and those players actively playing, only head coaches are allowed to be on the court itself. The raised floor is one of only a few remaining in the United States and contributes to the historic aura of the 90-year-old arena. This served as the inspiration for the NCAA Tournament's Final Four, which in recent years has often set its court above the stadium floor. 

The floor in Williams Arena was changed in 2009, replacing the original playing surface from 1928 with a new floor along with new baskets. This was the first major upgrade to the facility since a renovation occurred in the early 1990s. Memorial Gymnasium at Vanderbilt University and Hinkle Fieldhouse at Butler University are two other existing arenas with a raised floor.

Seating capacity 
From 1950 until the opening of Marriott Center at Brigham Young University in 1971, it had the largest capacity of any collegiate basketball arena in the country. Hinkle Fieldhouse at Butler University also was constructed in 1928, and held the honor of being the highest capacity arena until the remodeling of Williams Arena in 1950.

See also
 List of NCAA Division I basketball arenas

References

External links

 Williams Arena at GopherSports.com

College basketball venues in the United States
College wrestling venues in the United States
Basketball venues in Minnesota
Minnesota Golden Gophers basketball venues
Minnesota Golden Gophers wrestling venues
Defunct college ice hockey venues in the United States
Sports venues in Minneapolis
Sports venues completed in 1928
1928 establishments in Minnesota
College volleyball venues in the United States
NCAA Division I men's basketball tournament Final Four venues